Valåsen och Labbsand is a locality (tätort) situated in Karlskoga Municipality, Örebro County, Sweden with 354 inhabitants in 2020.

Established in 2015, but had previously been part of Karlskoga, according to Statistics Sweden.

Geography 
Valåsen och Labbsand is near the course of the River Valån. The area is completely located in the Karlskoga Municipality.

The locality lies mostly to the south of Valåsen Manor, and is bounded notionally by Kilsbergen (the low mountainous ridge) to the east, Lake Möckeln to the west, Degerfors Municipality to the south. To the north is a subdivision of Moelven Industrier, Moelven Valåsen AB.

The area is mostly residential, the particular exception being Karlskoga Golf Club.

Bus services run to both Central Karlskoga and Degerfors.

History 
In 1632, Valåsen was established as an ironworks, the very first works in the Karlskoga Socken. The ironworks was disestablished in 1918.

Notable people 

 Erland von Hofsten, ironmaster
 Nils von Hofsten, politician
 Johanna Christina von Hofsten, Swedish-language children's writer
 Stina Swartling, writer

References

Further reading 

 

Populated places in Karlskoga Municipality